Sam Johnson (born May 18, 1959) is a former American football defensive back who played one season with the Toronto Argonauts of the Canadian Football League. He was drafted by the Detroit Lions in the sixth round of the 1981 NFL Draft. He played college football at the University of Maryland, College Park.

References

External links
Just Sports Stats
College stats

Living people
1959 births
Players of American football from North Carolina
American football defensive backs
Canadian football defensive backs
American players of Canadian football
Maryland Terrapins football players
Toronto Argonauts players
People from Cumberland County, North Carolina